The David N. Peet Farmstead is a historic farmstead in Deerhorn Township, Minnesota, United States.  It was listed on the National Register of Historic Places in 1980 for its local significance in the theme of agriculture.  The listing consists of four contributing properties: the 1901 barn, 1902 Queen Anne farmhouse, 1912 wood-hoop silo, and 1920 windmill.  The property was nominated for being one of Wilkin County's best exemplars of the prosperity achieved by some of its late-19th-century farmers.  Peet acquired the property in 1881.

See also
 National Register of Historic Places listings in Wilkin County, Minnesota

References

1881 establishments in Minnesota
Buildings and structures in Wilkin County, Minnesota
Farms on the National Register of Historic Places in Minnesota
National Register of Historic Places in Wilkin County, Minnesota
Queen Anne architecture in Minnesota